Mandinga may refer to:

 Mandinka people, an ethnic group in West Africa
 Mandinga (band), a Romanian pop group
 Mandinga (album), a Brazilian album by Projeto Mandinga
 Mandinga (film) a 1978 Italian exploitation film inspired by Mandingo
 Mandinga River (river), a river in Panama